Ing Fraser (1928 – 15 November 1957) was an Australian gymnast. She competed in five events at the 1956 Summer Olympics.

Fraser died of leukaemia in 1957.

References

External links
 

1928 births
1957 deaths
Australian female artistic gymnasts
Olympic gymnasts of Australia
Gymnasts at the 1956 Summer Olympics
Place of birth missing
Deaths from leukemia
Deaths from cancer in Queensland
20th-century Australian women